Iwuy is a commune in the Nord department in northern France.

Heraldry

See also
Communes of the Nord department

References

External links
 Official website
 Aujourd'hui à Iwuy

Communes of Nord (French department)